Alfred "Alfie" Conn (2 October 1926 – 7 January 2009) was a Scottish professional footballer, most commonly remembered as part of the Terrible Trio of the Heart of Midlothian side of the 1950s, along with Willie Bauld and Jimmy Wardhaugh.

Heart of Midlothian

Conn was born in Prestonpans, East Lothian. He joined Hearts from Inveresk Athletic in 1944, making his debut later that year in a 4–0 win over Dumbarton in a wartime Southern League match. He established himself in the first team in the 1948–49 season, when first combined with Bauld and Wardhaugh. Conn's energetic, tenacious style and powerful shooting complemented the cerebral play of Bauld and the dribbling skills of Wardhaugh. Their first match as a forward trio resulted in a 6–1 victory over East Fife. The Terrible Trio continued to score freely in the following 5 seasons, Conn notching 102 goals. Hearts became regular top four finishers yet defensive inconsistency ensured they failed to collect any silverware.

Conn eventually won his first medal in the 1954–55 season, when Hearts defeated Motherwell 4–2 in the 1954 Scottish League Cup Final. The following season, Conn scored as Hearts defeated Celtic 3–1 in the 1956 Scottish Cup Final, their first triumph in that competition for 50 years. He ended that 1955-56 season at the peak of his powers aged 29 with a career best 29 goals from 41 games.

Two weeks after the cup win Conn attained his only Scotland cap on 2 May 1956 at Hampden Park. He put his side ahead after 12 minutes in a 1–1 draw with Austria.

Conn suffered a serious ankle injury and was to never be the same player again. In the league he made only 10 appearances in 1956-57 and only five when Hearts won the League in 1957–58.

He scored 221 goals in 408 games for Hearts.

Raith Rovers

Conn transferred to Raith Rovers in search of regular first team football. Over two seasons he scored 15 times in the 34 league games he played. He retired from playing in 1960.

After playing

Conn had a brief spell as manager of both Gala Fairydean and Raith Rovers. Conn watched his son, Alfie Conn Jr., establish a successful footballing career of his own, notably with both Rangers and Celtic. Conn Sr. died on 7 January 2009, at the age of 82.

References

Sources

External links
Appearances at londonhearts.com

Expatriate soccer players in South Africa
Scottish expatriate footballers
Scottish Football League players
Scottish footballers
Scotland international footballers
Heart of Midlothian F.C. players
Scottish expatriate sportspeople in South Africa
Raith Rovers F.C. players
Scottish football managers
Raith Rovers F.C. managers
People from Prestonpans
1926 births
2009 deaths
Scottish Football League representative players
Footballers from East Lothian
Scottish Football League managers
Association football inside forwards